The 1962 Michigan State Spartans football team represented Michigan State University in the 1962 Big Ten Conference football season. In their ninth season under head coach Duffy Daugherty, the Spartans compiled a 5–4 overall record 3–3 against Big Ten opponents) and finished in fifth place in the Big Ten Conference.

Two Spartans were selected as first-team players on the 1962 All-Big Ten Conference football team. Halfback George Saimes received first-team honors from the Associated Press (AP) and United Press International (UPI), and center Dave Behrman received first-team honors from the AP. Saimes was also a consensus first-team selection for the 1962 College Football All-America Team. Guard Ed Budde was selected by Time magazine as a first-team All-American.

The 1962 Spartans won all three of their annual rivalry games. In the annual Indiana–Michigan State football rivalry game, the Spartans defeated the Hoosiers by a 26 to 8 score. In the Notre Dame rivalry game, the Spartans defeated the Fighting Irish by a 31 to 7 score. And, in the annual Michigan–Michigan State football rivalry game, the Spartans defeated the Wolverines by a 28 to 0 score. In non-conference play, the Spartans defeated North Carolina (38–6) and lost to Stanford (16–13).

Schedule

Roster
 FB George Saimes, Sr.
 RB Ron Rubick

See also
 1962 in Michigan

References

Michigan State
Michigan State Spartans football seasons
Michigan State Spartans football